Deinandra is a genus of flowering plants in the tribe Madieae within the family Asteraceae. Such a genus is not recognized as distinct by all authorities; its species are often treated as members of the genus Hemizonia.

Distribution
Deinandra plants are native to the Western United States (California and Arizona); and northwest Mexico (Baja California and Baja California Sur).

Species
The following species are accepted in the genus Deinandra:
 Deinandra arida - Red Rock tarweed - Kern County, California
 Deinandra bacigalupii - Livermore tarweed - Alameda County, California
 Deinandra clementina - California
 Deinandra conjugens - Otay tarweed: Otay Mesa area in San Diego County, California and Baja California
 Deinandra corymbosa - California from Santa Barbara County to Humboldt County
 Deinandra fasciculata - clustered tarweed: southern California and Baja California
 Deinandra floribunda - California and Baja California
 Deinandra frutescens - Guadalupe Island, Mexico
 Deinandra greeneana - Baja California including Guadalupe Island
 Deinandra halliana - central California (Monterey, San Luis Obispo, Fresno, San Benito Counties)
 Deinandra increscens - grassland tarweed - central California (Monterey, San Luis Obispo, Santa Barbara Counties)
 Deinandra kelloggii - California (from Mendocino to Imperial Counties), Arizona (Pima County), Baja California
 Deinandra lobbii  - central and northern California
 Deinandra martirensis - Baja California, Baja California Sur
 Deinandra minthornii  - Santa Susana tarweed: California endemic in Santa Susana Mountains, Simi Hills, and Santa Monica Mountains of Southern California (Los Angeles and Ventura Counties). (State and CNPS listed 'rare species.')
 Deinandra mohavensis - Mojave tarweed - California (San Diego, Riverside, San Bernardino, Kern Counties)
 Deinandra pallida - California (from Solano County to Los Angeles County)
 Deinandra palmeri - Baja California 
 Deinandra paniculata - California and Baja California
 Deinandra pentactis - central California (Monterey, San Luis Obispo, Kings, San Benito, Santa Clara, San Mateo Counties)
 Deinandra streetsii - Baja California

References

External links
 
 USDA Plants Profile: Deinandra

 
Asteraceae genera
Flora of the Western United States
Flora of Baja California
Flora of Baja California Sur
Flora of Mexican Pacific Islands